The South Dakota Board of Regents (also known as SDBOR) is a governing board that controls six public universities in the U.S. state of South Dakota. These include Black Hills State University, Dakota State University, Northern State University, South Dakota School of Mines and Technology, South Dakota State University, and the University of South Dakota. The Board also governs the South Dakota School for the Blind and Visually Impaired and the South Dakota School for the Deaf. 

In control of all institutional decisions for the six public universities, the Board has an operating budget of approximately $306 million. As of June 2022, the members of the Board of Regents are as follows:

Pam Roberts, Pierre - board president
Jim Thares, Aberdeen - vice president
Tony Venhuizen, Sioux Falls - board secretary
John W. Bastian, Belle Fourche
Brock Brown, Lake Norden - student member
Jeff Partridge, Rapid City
Tim Rave, Baltic
Dr. Joan Wink, Howes 
There is currently one vacancy on the board following the resignation in 2022 of Barb Stork of Dakota Dunes

Institutions

See also

List of colleges and universities in South Dakota

References

External links
South Dakota Board of Regents

Public education in South Dakota
Board of Regents
Governing bodies of universities and colleges in the United States